Get a life is an idiom and catch phrase that has gained international usage. It is intended as a taunt, to indicate that the person being so addressed is attempting to devote themselves to other people's responsibilities. Sometimes the phrase is used to describe people who are viewed as officious or meddling in the affairs of others. It is another way of saying "get your own life", or "mind your own business".

The phrase has also appeared as a generally more emphatic variant of the taunt "get a job" and implies the addressee needs to go out and make their way in the world, without being supported by outside sources such as parents or benefactors.

It may also be directed at someone who is perceived as boring or single-minded; suggesting they acquire some other, more practical interests or hobbies and get dates, find a job, or move into their own home.

It is also applied to workaholics and others who are perceived as dedicated to their work, but not taking the time to relax or enjoy life.

Documented early use

1983: The first Oxford English Dictionary citation is from a January 1983 Washington Post article: "Gross me out, I mean, Valley Girl was, like, ohmigod, it was last year, fer sure! I mean, get a life! Say what?"
1986: Appears in Baby Anger page 48 as "Get a life, people of New Jersey!"
1986: The phrase was used by actor William Shatner in his appearance in a December episode of Saturday Night Live, in which he shows up at a Star Trek convention and implores a group of Trekkies who are obsessed with the details of Shatner's life to move out of their parents' basements and "get a life."

References

English-language idioms
English phrases